Francesco Gabriotti (12 August 1914 – 11 February 1987) was an Italian association footballer who played as a forward and who competed in the 1936 Summer Olympics. He was a member of the Italian team, which won the gold medal in the football tournament.

Honours

International 
Italy
Olympic Gold Medal: 1936

References

External links
Francesco Gabriotti's profile at databaseOlympics.com

1914 births
1987 deaths
Italian footballers
Footballers at the 1936 Summer Olympics
Olympic footballers of Italy
Olympic gold medalists for Italy
Italy international footballers
Olympic medalists in football
Medalists at the 1936 Summer Olympics
Association football forwards